The High Commissioner of Australia to South Africa, known from 1961 to 1994 as the Ambassador of Australia to South Africa, is an officer of the Australian Department of Foreign Affairs and Trade and the head of the High Commission of the Commonwealth of Australia to South Africa in Pretoria. The position has the rank and status of an Ambassador Extraordinary and Plenipotentiary and is currently held by Gita Kamath since 2 March 2019. 

The ambassador also holds non-resident accreditation as High Commissioner to Botswana (1973–1981, since 2004), Eswatini (since 1973), Lesotho (since 1973), Mozambique (since 2004), and Namibia (since 2010); and as Ambassador to Angola (since 2010), and the representative to the Southern African Development Community. The high commission also has oversight for Honorary Consulates in Luanda, Angola, and Maputo, Mozambique.

Posting history

The Australian Government has offered diplomatic representation in Pretoria, South Africa since 1946. Between 1961 and 1994 the designation of the Australian representative in South Africa changed from High Commissioner to Ambassador. On 9 July 1973, ambassador Colin Moodie received non-resident accreditation as Australia's first High Commissioner to Botswana, Lesotho and Swaziland.

Heads of mission

Notes
 Also non-resident High Commissioner to Eswatini (Swaziland before 2018), 1973–present.
 Also non-resident High Commissioner to Lesotho, 1973–present.
 Also non-resident High Commissioner to Botswana, 1973–1981, 2004–present.
 Also non-resident High Commissioner to Mozambique, 2004–present.
 Also non-resident High Commissioner to Namibia, 2004–present.
 Also non-resident Ambassador to Angola, 2010–present.

See also
Australia–South Africa relations
Foreign relations of Australia
Foreign relations of South Africa

References

External links

Australian High Commission Pretoria

 
 
 
 
South Africa
Australia
Australia–South Africa relations
Australia and the Commonwealth of Nations
South Africa and the Commonwealth of Nations